Andrej Halaša was a Slovak melodramatic promoter, translator, editor, and ethnographer. He was born in 1852 in Dolný Kubín, and he died in 1913 in Martin. He studied at the elementary schools in Revúca, and in Levoča, and then at the University of Law in Prešov. He started work in Dolný Kubín as a clerk lawyer, and in 1874 worked as an independent lawyer in Martin.

Acts of Andrej Halaša
Andrej Halaša organized cultural endeavorshe helped in the creation and development of the status of the National House in Martin, the first museum building. He organized cultural festivals such as the "August festival".

He was treasurer of Slovak Natural Party and MS and was an active member of the Bohemian choir. He translated plays from various languages and edited two theatrical editions; he published two magazines, and collected over ten thousand texts of Slovak folk songs. From his early youth, he was involved in the Slovak National group; he was a leading character in the cultural areas of theatre, publicity, literature, and research.

Andrej Halaša was an ideologist and publicist of the Slovak National Party, a co-operator of Živena and book printing society, editor and publisher in Slovak press. In the year 1888, he helped creating the National House, and five years later he created the Theatre Society and the well known Theatre in Martin.

External links 
 Personalities of Martin 
 Personalities at orava.sk 

1852 births
1913 deaths
People from Dolný Kubín
19th-century Slovak people
19th-century translators
Slovak translators
Burials at National Cemetery in Martin